The Weight of the World is the seventh studio album by American heavy metal band Metal Church. It was released in 2004 through the Steamhammer/SPV label.

This album marks the beginning of Metal Church's third major line-up, with the addition of Ronny Munroe (vocals), Jay Reynolds (guitar), and Steve Unger (bass). This album is also the last to feature Kirk Arrington on drums. It is hailed by critics and fans alike as Metal Church's comeback album.

The prevalent themes of this album include crime, war, rejection, and madness.

Reception

Reviews for The Weight of the World were mixed. Reviewer Eduardo Rivadavia of AllMusic lamented "the band's maddening tendencies for songwriting inconsistency, matching every memorable turn like 'Hero's Soul' or 'Sunless Sky' with an equally forgettable outing like 'Wings of Tomorrow' or 'Bomb to Drop.'" He criticized new singer Ronny Munroe, who "doesn't always have the power or presence to match the surrounding onslaught", but stated his belief that longtime fans of the band would like most of the album's songs. Tony Daley of Blabbermouth.net was also critical of Munroe's performance and was not convinced by "the sound of the pre-thrash New Wave Of British Heavy Metal" the album offers and by "the pool of average ideas" that makes up the eight minute pièce de résistance "Madman's Soul". However he conceded that if "you don't mind the odd dip in quality, then Weight of the World is a likable, if flawed, piece of work."

Exclaim! review by Greg Pratt was more positive, stating that The Weight of the World "gives that metal punch we all knew the band was capable of delivering", because "the ten tunes are jam-packed with classic '80s heavy metal riffs, from glorious thrash to some NWOBHM melodic near-punksters". Rock Hard reviewer remarked the 1980s feel of the music and praised the "smoky-aggressive voice" of Munroe and Metal Church for providing "grand songwriting, horny hooks and a feeling for the synthesis of hammer-hard rhythms and memorable melodies." Despite "the somewhat muddy production and one or two average songs" he elected Weight of the World the comeback album of the year.

Track listing

Personnel 
Metal Church
Ronny Munroe – vocals
Kurdt Vanderhoof – guitar, producer, engineer, mixing
Jay Reynolds – guitar
Steve Unger – bass
Kirk Arrington – drums

Production
Mark Greer – mixing, mastering at Bandit Audio in Olympia, Washington
Kurdt Vanderhoof, Kathy Moats – artwork
Dick Moats – photography
Chris Jacobson – executive producer

References

2004 albums
Metal Church albums
SPV/Steamhammer albums